Yaza Dewi may refer to:

 Yaza Dewi of Pagan, Chief Queen of Pagan (r. 1235–1251)
 Mwei Ma-Gu-Thauk, Queen of Hanthawaddy (r.  1350–1384)
 Piya Yaza Dewi, Chief Queen of Hanthawaddy (r. 1384–1392)
 Mwei Ohn-Naung, Chief Queen of Hanthawaddy (r. 1392–1421)
 Yaza Dewi (Binnya Ran I), Chief Queen of Hanthawaddy ( 1424–1446?)
 Yaza Dewi (Dhammazedi): Chief Queen of Hanthawaddy (r. 1471–1492)
 Yaza Dewi (Binnya Ran II): Queen of Hanthawaddy (r. 1492?–1526?)
 Yaza Dewi of Toungoo, Queen of Toungoo (r. 1516–1530)
 Yaza Dewi of Pegu, Queen of the Central Palace of Toungoo Dynasty (r. 1563–1564)
 Thiri Yaza Dewi, Queen of the Northern Palace of Toungoo Dynasty (r. 1583–1599)

Burmese royal titles